Waller County is a county in the U.S. state of Texas. As of the 2020 census, its population was 56,794. Its county seat is Hempstead. The county was named for Edwin Waller, a signer of the Texas Declaration of Independence and first mayor of Austin.

Waller County is included in the Houston-The Woodlands-Sugar Land, TX metropolitan statistical area. It is home of the Prairie View A&M University.

Geography

Adjacent counties
 Grimes County (north)
 Montgomery County (northeast)
 Harris County (east)
 Fort Bend County (south)
 Austin County (west)
 Washington County (northwest)

Communities

Cities

 Brookshire
 Hempstead (county seat)
 Katy (partly in Harris and Fort Bend Counties)
 Pattison
 Prairie View
 Waller (partly in Harris County)

Town
 Pine Island

Unincorporated areas

 Fields Store
 Monaville
 Second Corinth
 Shiloh
 Sunny Side

Demographics

Note: the U.S. Census Bureau treats Hispanic/Latino as an ethnic category. This table excludes Latinos from the racial categories and assigns them to a separate category. Hispanics/Latinos can be of any race.

As of the 2000 census, 32,663 people, 10,557 households, and 7,748 families resided in the county.  The population density was 64 people per square mile (25/km2).  The 11,955 housing units averaged 23 per square mile (9/km2). The racial makeup of the county was 57.83% White, 29.25% Black or African American, 0.49% Native American, 0.38% Asian, 0.02% Pacific Islander, 10.28% from other races, and 1.76% from two or more races.  About 19.42% of the population was Hispanic or Latino of any race.

Of the  10,557 households, 35.1% had children under 18 living with them, 55.7% were married couples living together, 13.0% had a female householder with no husband present, and 26.6% were not families. About 21.0% of all households were made up of individuals, and 7.5% had someone living alone who was 65  or older.  The average household size was 2.79, and the average family size was 3.25.

In the county, the population was distributed as 25.70% under 18, 18.10% from 18 to 24, 26.40% from 25 to 44, 20.50% from 45 to 64, and 9.40% who were 65  or older.  The median age was 30 years. For every 100 females, there were 98.70 males.  For every 100 females 18, and over, there were 96.10 males.

The median income for a household in the county was $38,136, and for a family was $45,868. Males had a median income of $34,447 versus $25,583 for females. The per capita income for the county was $16,338.  About 11.50% of families and 16.00% of the population were below the poverty line, including 20.00% of those under age 18 and 12.30% of those age 65 or over.

Economy
Igloo Corporation, a manufacturer of cooling and portable refrigeration products, is headquartered in unincorporated Waller County between Brookshire and Katy. In 2004, Igloo announced that it was consolidating its corporate, distribution, and manufacturing operations in Waller County.

Goya Foods has its Texas offices in an unincorporated area of the county near Brookshire.

Politics and government

United States Congress

Texas Legislature

Texas Senate
District 18: Lois Kolkhorst (R)- first elected in 2014.

Texas House of Representatives
District 3: Cecil Bell, Jr. (R)- first elected in 2013.

Voting controversies
A history of controversies exists regarding the reluctance of county officials to allow students attending historically black Prairie View A&M University to vote in Waller County.

As reported by the US District Court (Southern District of Texas, Corpus Christi Division) in Veasey v Perry, October 2014 (CIVIL ACTION NO. 13-CV-00193), pp 6–7 verbatim:
 In 1971, after the 26th Amendment extended the vote to those 18 years old and older, Waller County, which was home to Prairie View A&M University (PVAMU), a historically Black university, became troubled with race issues. Waller County's tax assessor and voter registrar prohibited students from voting unless they or their families owned property in the county. This practice was ended by a three-judge court in 1979.
 In 1992, a county prosecutor indicted PVAMU students for illegally voting, but dropped the charges after receiving a protest from the DOJ.
 In 2003, a PVAMU student ran for the commissioner's court. The local district attorney and county attorney threatened to prosecute students for voter fraud—for not meeting the old domicile test. These threatened prosecutions were enjoined, but Waller County then reduced early voting hours, which was particularly harmful to students because the election day was during their spring break. After the NAACP filed suit, Waller County reversed the changes to early voting and the student narrowly won the election.
 In 2007–08, during then Senator Barack Obama's campaign for president, Waller County made a number of voting changes without seeking clearance. The county rejected “incomplete” voter registrations and required volunteer deputy registrars (VDRs) to personally find and notify the voters of the rejection. The county also limited the number of new registrations any VDR could submit, thus limiting the success of voter registration drives. These practices were eventually prohibited by a consent decree.

In 2018, the NAACP Legal Defense Fund filed a lawsuit in U.S. district court, alleging that the county's early-voting plan unduly limits early voting opportunities for students at Prairie View A&M.  On October 10, Jacob Aronowitz, a field director for Democratic U.S. House candidate Mike Siegel, delivered a letter from Siegel, which indicated a solution to attempts to keep students at Prairie View A&M University from voting, to a clerk on the county executive's staff.  As a result, Aronowitz was arrested for what he was told was "48 hour investigative detention."

Law enforcement
 the current sheriff is Troy Guidry, who was elected in 2020. The previous sheriff was Glenn Smith, who had been sheriff since 2008. Smith was previously chief of the police department of Hempstead, where he had been fired by the town council. 
after allegations that he and four white officers had exhibited racism and police brutality during the arrest of a 35-year-old black man.

Sandra Bland was a 28-year-old woman who was arrested by a Texas State Trooper in Waller County on July 10, 2015, as the result of a traffic stop.  According to officials, she committed suicide by hanging in her Waller County Jail cell three days later. This incident garnered national attention and prompted the Texas state legislature to enact the Sandra Bland Act (SB 1849) which encompasses such things as procedures for jail staff, addressing substance abuse of prisoners, the mental health of prisoners, and the completion of a 40-hour Crisis Intervention Training (TCOLE) course for all persons in Texas holding a law enforcement officer's license (Chapter 1701, Occupations Code).

In November 2021, a 16 year old was charged with six counts of aggravated assault for crashing into six people on bicycles while attempting to roll coal.  All four of the riders were hospitalized for their injuries, two of them being airlifted. According to defense attorneys hired by the injured, the injuries included "broken vertebrae, cervical and lumbar spinal injuries, broken collar bones, hands, and wrists [requiring surgical intervention], multiple traumatic brain injuries, lacerations, soft tissue damage, road rash, and extensive bruising" The Waller county district attorney, Elton Mathis, released a statement about the handling of the case by the Waller Police Department in which he said "This case was not handled appropriately by the investigating agency.   PERIOD."  According to his statement, the Texas Department of Public Safety urged the local police to treat the scene as a crime scene, and to contact the district attorney's office.  Despite this, the local police released the 16 year old without doing an investigation.

Education
School districts serving Waller County include:
 Hempstead Independent School District
 Royal Independent School District
 Katy Independent School District (portions of the district are in other counties)
 Waller Independent School District (portions of the district are in other counties)

Brazos Valley Sudbury School was previously in operation in Waller County.

Blinn College is the designated community college for all of the county.

Prairie View A&M University is the only university located within the county.

Media

The Waller Times publishes local community news, school news, and sports news weekly on Mondays. It was founded in 1991 and is still family owned and operated.

Transportation

Major highways
  Interstate 10
  U.S. Highway 90
  U.S. Highway 290
  State Highway 6
  State Highway 159

The TTC-69 component (recommended preferred) of the once-planned Trans-Texas Corridor went through Waller County.

Airports
Houston Executive Airport is located between Brookshire and Katy in an unincorporated area. Skydive Houston Airport (Skylake Airport) is located south of Waller in an unincorporated area.

The Houston Airport System stated that Waller County is within the primary service area of George Bush Intercontinental Airport, an international airport in Houston in Harris County. In addition William P. Hobby Airport in Houston and in Harris County has commercial airline service.

See also

 List of museums in the Texas Gulf Coast
 National Register of Historic Places listings in Waller County, Texas
 Recorded Texas Historic Landmarks in Waller County

References

External links

 Waller County government's website
 
 The Waller Times official website

 
1873 establishments in Texas
Black Belt (U.S. region)
Populated places established in 1873
Greater Houston
Majority-minority counties in Texas